The Central African Republic has sent athletes to every Summer Olympic Games held between 1984 and 2020, as well as its first appearance in 1968.  The country, however, has yet to win an Olympic medal.  No athletes from the Central African Republic have competed in any Winter Olympic Games.

Medal tables

Medals by Summer Games

See also
 List of flag bearers for the Central African Republic at the Olympics
 Central African Republic at the Paralympics

External links
 
 
 

 
Olympics